Lidia Ramírez (born 27 July 1948) is a Mexican former swimmer. She competed in four events at the 1968 Summer Olympics.

References

External links
 

1948 births
Living people
Mexican female swimmers
Olympic swimmers of Mexico
Swimmers at the 1968 Summer Olympics
Swimmers from Mexico City
20th-century Mexican women